Tresham College of Further and Higher Education (formerly Tresham Institute of Further and Higher Education)  is a further education college in the East Midlands of England. Specifically located within Northamptonshire, the main campus is located within the town of Kettering, alongside other campuses included within Corby and Wellingborough.

Admissions
The college headquarters are on the former site of Kettering Grammar School, which originally opened around 1965 on that site. The former buildings were demolished in 2007.

It has three main campus locations, all located within the county of Northamptonshire, in:
 Kettering
 Wellingborough
 Corby

Partnerships 
The Tresham College Silverstone Centre, based at Silverstone motor racing circuit, is Britain's National College for Motorsport and is classed as a centre of excellence. The college is also a lead academic sponsor of Silverstone University Technical College which is due to open at the circuit in September 2013.

Tresham College has also been a delivery partner for the Prince's Trust Team programme since 1999 and in September 2009 have begun to deliver the Prince's Trust XL programme to 14- to 16-year-olds.

Tresham College is partnered with De Montfort University, Thames Valley University, University of Bedfordshire and University of Northampton.

History
The college opened in 1978 when Kettering and Corby further education colleges merged. When Wellingborough College merged on 1 April 1992, the college became Tresham Institute of Further and Higher Education.

It took over the site of Kettering Boys' School in 1993, which became its headquarters in September 1994. The college is named after the Northamptonshire dynasty and lineage of Tresham. Rutland College merged with Tresham Institute in 2000. On 8 July 2009 'Tresham Institute' became 'Tresham College of Further and Higher Education'.

Redevelopment 
The Corby campus re-opened with an entirely new building on a different site in September 2011. The Kettering campus has improved security to match the Corby campus and further extensions are planned. The Wellingborough Campus also has significant plans for redevelopment.

The redevelopment resulted in the demolition of the Kettering Boys' School building, which featured a 1962 mural, the Kettering Abstract, by Kenneth Budd. The mural was removed to safekeeping at the behest of the Kettering Civic Society, who, are seeking a new home for it.

Former schools
As well as Kettering Grammar School, whose site was seconded in 1993, the former Corby Community College in Corby was taken over in 2009. This school had originated as Corby Grammar School, a grammar school on Oakley Road which became the comprehensive Southwood School in 1973, then the Queen Elizabeth School in 1982. John Sutton CBE was headmaster of these schools from 1973-88. He later became General Secretary from 1988-98 of the Secondary Heads Association (became the Association of School and College Leaders in 2006). John Kempe was headmaster of Corby Grammar School from 1955–67; he was later headmaster of Gordonstoun from 1968-78. Colin Dexter, the author, taught Classics at Corby Grammar School from 1959-66. As well as Corby Grammar School, there was Kingswood Grammar School in the town (now The Kingswood School), which opened in 1965.

Notable Alumnus (Corby Grammar School)
 Prof Andrew Pettigrew OBE, Professor of Strategy and Organisation since 2008 at the Saïd Business School (University of Oxford), and Professor of Strategy and Organisation from 1995-2003 at the Warwick Business School (University of Warwick)

References

External links
 

Buildings and structures in Kettering
Higher education colleges in England
Further education colleges in Northamptonshire
Educational institutions established in 1978
1978 establishments in England
Corby
Education in North Northamptonshire
Wellingborough